Lambia is a genus of green algae in the family Bryopsidaceae.

The genus name of Lambia is in honour of Elke Mackenzie (1911–1990), born as Ivan Mackenzie Lamb, who was a British polar explorer and botanist who specialised in the field of lichenology.

The genus was circumscribed by René Delépine in Compt. Rend. Hebd. Seances Acad. Sci. ser.D, vol.264 on pages 1410 and
1413 in 1967.

References

External links

Bryopsidales genera
Bryopsidales